John Fitzgerald and Anders Järryd were the defending champions but only Fitzgerald competed that year with Boris Becker.

Becker and Fitzgerald won in the final 6–4, 7–6 against Peter McNamara and Paul McNamee.

Seeds

  Boris Becker /  John Fitzgerald (champions)
  Ivan Lendl /  Christo van Rensburg (quarterfinals)
  Mark Edmondson /  Sherwood Stewart (quarterfinals)
  Brad Drewett /  Kim Warwick (semifinals)

Draw

External links
1986 Swan Premium Open Doubles Draw

Doubles